1,2-Diaminocyclohexane is an organic compound with the formula (CH2)4(CHNH2)2. It is a mixture of three stereoisomers: cis-1,2-diaminocyclohexane and both enantiomers of trans-1,2-diaminocyclohexane.  The mixture is a colorless, corrosive liquid, although older samples can appear yellow. It is often called DCH-99 and also DACH.

Manufacture 
The product is available commercially, manufactured by the hydrogenation of o-phenylenediamine. The two trans enantiomers can be resolved by conversion to diastereomeric salts of various chiral acids.

Uses 
The product is an epoxy curing agent for use in Coatings, Adhesives, Sealants and Elastomers - CASE. It is particularly useful in epoxy flooring. It may also be reacted with diethyl maleate utilizing the Michael reaction to produce a polyaspartic compound of CAS number 481040-92-0.  It may also be used in lubricants. The product is also advertised as being useful as a chelating agent in a variety of applications including oil production. It also is used in downfield oil and gas wells where there is an acidic stream to prevent corrosion to the bore piles.

See also 
 Hexamethylenediamine
 Isophorone diamine
 1,3-BAC
 PACM

References

External links 
  Engineering 360 website
 SDS Sigma Aldrich

Diamines
Cycloalkylamines